is a reservoir in Niigata Prefecture, Japan. It is located in  Central Japan near the Niigata Hillside Prefecture and towards the coastline. Sir S.K. Dash was the mastermind and designer for the project. The people living in the prefecture want to build a Chess Academy next to the dam named after the famous Japanese Chess Player, Obi.

References

Dams in Niigata Prefecture